Assets School is a co-educational, independent K-12 school in Honolulu County, Hawaii. The high school is in the Honolulu census-designated place while the elementary school is in Hickam Housing CDP. The school focuses on educating students who are gifted and/or dyslexic. The school opened in 1955.

High school relocation
In 2015 Assets moved their high school division to the former campus of the Academy of the Pacific.

References

External links
Official site

Private K-12 schools in Honolulu County, Hawaii
Private high schools in Honolulu
Educational institutions established in 1955
1955 establishments in Hawaii